Chaudhry Khadim Hussain is a Pakistani politician who had been a member of the National Assembly of Pakistan, from June 2013 to May 2018. Previously, he had been a member of the Provincial Assembly of the Punjab from 2012 to 2013.

Political career
He served as Jhelum tehsil Nazim.

He was elected to the Provincial Assembly of the Punjab as an independent candidate for Constituency PP-26 (Jhelum-III) in by-polls held in December 2012. He received 39,000 votes and defeated an independent candidate, Raja Afzal.

He was elected to the National Assembly of Pakistan as a candidate of Pakistan Muslim League (N) from Constituency NA-62 (Jhelum-I) in 2013 Pakistani general election. He received 102,230 votes and defeated a candidate of Pakistan Tehreek-e-Insaf.

References

Living people
Pakistan Muslim League (N) politicians
Punjabi people
Pakistani MNAs 2013–2018
Year of birth missing (living people)
Punjab MPAs 2008–2013

Politicians from Jhelum